Tolon-Kumbungu District is a former district that was located in Northern Region, Ghana. Originally created as an ordinary district assembly in 1988, which was created from the former West Dagomba District Council. However on 28 June 2012, it was split out into two new districts: Tolon District (capital: Tolon) and Kumbungu District (capital: Kumbungu). The district assembly was located in the central part of Northern Region and had Tolon as its capital town.

See also
 
 GhanaDistricts.com
 Titagya Schools

References

Districts of the Northern Region (Ghana)

Dagbon